Ilene Segalove (born 1950) is an American conceptual artist working with appropriated images, photography and video whose work can be understood as a precursor to The Pictures Generation.

Career

Early life and education
Segalove was born and raised in Los Angeles, California, United States. She studied Fine Arts at the University of California, Santa Barbara in 1968. While studying there she met Billy Adler and John Margolies, who became her collaborators and professors and introduced her to the concept that one’s personal narrative could be strong material for art. She collaborated with them in a project called Telethon, a work in which they interviewed others about their personal experiences in relation to anthropological models, recorded it, and presented it in the University gallery as an installation made up of a living room with sofas, TV dinners and a television. But Segalove's first introduction to the video was through her sculpture professor, Roland Brenner. Other early influences in using the medium of video included Wolfgang Stoerchle, then a graduate student at UCSB who later taught at CalArts, and the curator David Ross who had come from New York and was to launch the most comprehensive video exhibition in the coming years.

Upon completion of her bachelor's degree in Fine Arts at the University of California, Santa Barbara in 1972, Segalove purchased a Sony PortaPak from Naim June Paik’s girlfriend. She returned to Los Angeles and began taking classes with John Baldessari at CalArts. He encouraged Segalove to continue working with collage, with found or appropriated photographs and to reconstruct photographs from popular culture. At CalArts she met David Salle, Robert Longo, and Wolfgang Stoerchle, with whom she shared ideas and collaborated. Segalove made Today’s Program: Jackson Pollock, “Lavender Mist,” 1950, 1974, Gifts/I Love You/Bel Air Menthol, 1975, and If You Live Near Hollywood, You Can't Help But Look Like Some 8x10 Glossy, 1976. Each of these works entailed appropriating existing imagery and collaging it, using it as is, or restaging it in such a way that shows our internalization of the message that the media was selling us.

In addition to working with Baldessari and found imagery, Segalove was also exposed to the ideas germinating in the Feminist Art Program at CalArts which encouraged her to continue to train her camera on her personal experiences. In Mother’s Treasures, 1974, she sequences a series of photographs of her mother sitting on the patio showing different works of art that Segalove had made throughout her childhood. These works included captions that told the story of her life in art through her mother’s eyes, her success and failures, and admonishments for not dating them and sometimes not even putting her name on them. The irony in this account foretells what was soon to be unleashed in the mother/daughter relationship that Segalove interrogated throughout her early career as an artist.

Video Art and the Vox Populi
Segalove completed the graduate program in Communication Arts at Loyola Marymount University, earning her master’s degree in 1975. At Loyola she honed the techniques of writing, directing and producing primarily for commercial output, but also continued making video art. She met Hildegarde Duane and they began to use each other as subjects or actors in their works. The two women shared a similar aesthetic and sentiment about artists using the media of video and photography to tell the stories of what it was like to be a woman. During this time The Mom Tapes, 1974-1978, in which Segalove trained her camera on her mother and their relationship, began to take shape. She was utilizing the interviewing strategies that she had learned while making Telethon and employing the new techniques acquired in the commercial television program at Loyola. In Secret Places, 1977, in which she photographs and prints so darkly that it is almost not discernible, places where she hid, lived and loved. Despite tapping into the personal, Segalove always infused her work with humor and irony. This stemmed from her childhood desire to become a cartoonist and has said that it informed her narrative style and interest in commenting on popular culture. According to her gallerist Tom Jancar, other influences on her video work include the satirical voices found in Mad Magazine and the work of William Hogarth and Honoré Daumier.

By the late 1970s Segalove was employing irony with ease in works such as US Treasury Nose, 1979 and TV is OK, 1979, but soon the irony begins to cut deeper in works like The Riot Tapes: A Personal History, 1984, and Female Fragments, 1987. In these works she addresses the personal directly by discussing her early experiences with sex, drugs, politics, and relationships, even so personal as to identify why her then boyfriend committed suicide, and then having to get mammograms because she has reached that age. But these works are soon tempered by a lighter version of a childhood crush in a text piece titled Kenny, 1987. In 1986 she made two works, Appliances and Bodyparts, which were pure audio narratives without any visual elements. Her occasional use of brief interviews emulating the vox populi, forged her segue into radio where she was a commentator on National Public Radio for several years. Despite this shift into audio works, Segalove continued creating visual art that became increasingly complex with clusters of images layered one on top of the other and sometimes interspersed with text. These included Home Entertainment Center, 1987, Amnesia, 1990, and Turn to Appendix, 1990.

Retrospective and Beyond
In 1990 the Laguna Art Museum organized a retrospective of Segalove’s work titled Ilene Segalove: Why I Got Into TV and Other Stories, encompassing much of the work that she had made since the 1970s. The exhibition included original collages, photographs, photomontages, installations, video and audio works and a catalogue with essays by Charles Desmarais and Lowell Darling. A few years later, Segalove began to make large-scale works she called "wall works" and also embarked on making a text based mural on the outside wall of a gallery. Shortly, she turned towards manipulating imagery and text in Photoshop, then a new medium for fine artists.

From the mid 1990s into the new millennium Segalove took a hiatus from making art and focused on writing books. In 1996 she co-authored a best-selling book titled List Your Self, an earnest and ironic nod to the conceptual practice of making lists ad infinitum. She returned to art in 2008 when she was included in the Getty Center’s California Video exhibition and in 2009 with her solo exhibition at the Jancar Gallery in Los Angeles. It was here that art collector Dean Valentine became acquainted with her work and began to understand how her gallerist Tom Jancar could claim that she was the “missing link” between the artists of Baldessari’s generation and that of The Pictures Generation. Within a year, Valentine curated a show of her work at Andre Rosen Gallery in New York touting her as standing “halfway between Martha Rosler and Cindy Sherman.”

Segalove’s Secret Museum of Mankind, 2011, takes its cue from an early work titled Close But No Cigar, 1976, in which she pairs images of herself with those from history, showed biting humor countered by a sobering acceptance of one's own place in the world. Segalove’s work exists as a testament and document to her desire to not disappear, to make a claim on her existence and relevance in the world today. Whatever Happened to My Future?, 2013, is a video in which Segalove converses with a younger version of herself. Throughout the video she enlightens her younger self about the changes that have taken place historically in  culture over the years. The viewer is a witness to the disappointments and amazements experienced by the younger Segalove and left feeling that the irony and playfulness of her youthful self is no longer sufficient for the artist who has reached a place of succinct maturity.

Teaching
Segalove taught at OTIS Collage of Art and Design in Los Angeles from the mid 1970s to the early 1980s; University of California, San Diego and University of California, Irvine in the mid to late 1970s; Harvard University and University of California, Santa Barbara in the late 1980s; California College of the Arts in the early 1990s; and most recently at University of California, Santa Barbara.

Exhibitions
Segalove's solo exhibitions have included;-
 “How to Look Prettier in a Picture,” California Institute of the Arts, Valencia, CA (1973)
 “California Casual,” ARCO Plaza, Los Angeles, CA (1977)
 “Videotapes by Ilene Segalove,” Berkeley Art Museum, Berkeley, CA (1979)
 “History of the Twentieth Century,” ARCO Center for the Visual Arts, Los Angeles, CA (1982)
 “Ilene Segalove,” CEPA Gallery, Buffalo, NY (1983);
 “Why I Got into TV and Other Stories,” Laguna Art Museum, Laguna Beach, CA (1990)
 “New Photographic Stories,” Julie Rico Gallery, Santa Monica, CA (1993)
 “Ilene Segalove,” Jancar Gallery, Los Angeles, CA (2009 & 2010)
 “The Dissatisfactions of Ilene Segalove,” Andrea Rosen Gallery, New York, NY (2010)
 “Dialogues in Time,” Jancar Gallery, Los Angeles, CA (2013).

Group exhibitions in which Segalove participated included;- 
 the “Whitney Biennial,” Whitney Museum of American Art, New York, NY (1975 and 1977)
 “Southland Video Anthology,” Long Beach Museum of Art, Long Beach, CA (1975)
 “LA from My Window,” Morgan Thomas Gallery, Los Angeles, CA (1975)
 “Sequential Imagery in Photography,” Broxton Gallery, Los Angeles, CA (1976)
 “Social Commentary,” Woman’s Building, Los Angeles, CA (1976)
 “Hildegarde Duane and Ilene Segalove,” Los Angeles Institute of Contemporary Art, Los Angeles, CA (1977)
 “Seven Evenings of Video by Women,” Woman’s Building, Los Angeles, CA (1977)
 “American Narrative/Story Art,” Contemporary Arts Museum, Houston, TX (1978)
 “Southern California Video Invitational 1979,” University of Southern California, Los Angeles, CA (1979)
 “New West,” The Kitchen, New York, NY (1979)
 “The Altered Photograph,” P.S. 1, Long Island City, NY (1979).

Segalove's video work has also featured in group exhibitions;-
 “Video Art: The Electronic Medium,” Museum of Contemporary Art, Chicago, IL (1980)
 “InsideOut: Self Beyond Likeness,” Newport Harbor Art Museum, Newport Beach, CA (1981)
 “Some Contemporary Portraits,” Contemporary Art Museum, Houston, TX (1982)
 “New Narrative,” Museum of Modern Art, New York, NY (1983)
 “The People Next Door,” Los Angeles Contemporary Exhibitions, Los Angeles, CA (1984)
 “Video from Vancouver to San Diego,” Museum of Modern Art, New York, NY (1985)
 “The Arts for Television,” Museum of Contemporary Art, Los Angeles, CA (1987)
 “Avant-Garde in the Eighties,” Los Angeles County Museum of Art, Los Angeles, CA (1987)
 “Identity: Representations of the Self,” Whitney Museum of Art, New York, NY, (1989)
 “Suburban Home Life: Tracking the American Dream,” Whitney Museum of Art, New York NY (1989)
 “Women in Video, Pioneers,” Long Beach Museum of Art, Long Beach, CA (1994)
 “P.L.A.N.: Photography Los Angeles Now,” Los Angeles County Museum of Art, Los Angeles, CA (1996).

The depth of Segalove’s art career was shown by her inclusion in several retrospective exhibitions about artists working in Los Angeles and California from the 1970s. 
 “California Video,” The J. Paul Getty Museum, Los Angeles, CA (2008);
 “Under the Big Black Sun: California Art 1974-1981,” Museum of Contemporary Art, Los Angeles, CA (2011)
 “State of Mind: New California Art Circa 1970,” Orange County Museum of Art, Newport Beach, CA (2011)
 “Segalove + Duane + Mogul,” Jancar Gallery, Los Angeles, CA (2011)
 “Everyday Epiphanies: Photography and Daily Life Since 1969,” The Metropolitan Museum of Art, New York, NY (2013).

Overseas Segalove’s work has been included in the 
 30th São Paulo Art Biennial, “The Immanence of Poetics,” São Paulo, Brazil (2012)
 “Biennale Cuvée,” OÖ Kulturquartier, Linz, Austria (2013)
 “The Second Sex,” Centre d’art Contemporain de Noisy-le-Sec, Paris, France (2013).

Collections
Segalove’s works are included numerous private and public collections including the Museum of Modern Art, Metropolitan Museum of Art, and the Jewish Museum in the New York area; the Hammer Museum, J. Paul Getty Museum, Museum of Contemporary Art, Los Angeles County Museum of Art, the Santa Barbara Museum of Art, and the Laguna Art Museum in the region of Southern California; and elsewhere such as the Museum of Fine Arts in Houston, the High Museum of Art in Atlanta and the Walker Art Center in Minneapolis.

Recognition
During each of the last four decades of the twentieth century, Segalove received National Endowment for the Arts grants for her work in Photography, Video, Media, and Radio. She also received the Young Talent Award from the Los Angeles County Museum of Art, along with the Filmmaker Award from the American Film Institute, the Contemporary Artist’s TV fund, and the Corporation for Public Broadcasting award throughout the decade of the 80s.

References

External links
 Kadist Art Foundation featuring work by Ilene Segalove
 Frieze Article on Ilene Segalove by Katie Kitamura, March 2011
 O.C. Review on Ilene Segalove by Cathy Curtis, April 30, 1990
 LA Times Article on Video Art by Don Snowden, October 18, 1987

1950 births
Living people
20th-century American artists
20th-century American women artists
21st-century American women artists
American conceptual artists
Women conceptual artists
American contemporary artists
Jewish American artists
Loyola Marymount University alumni
University of California, Santa Barbara alumni
Artists from Los Angeles
21st-century American Jews